Mario Enrique Galindo Calixto  (born 10 August 1951 in Punta Arenas) is a retired Chilean footballer.

Career
During his playing career, Galindo played at the club level for Colo Colo. He also represented the Chile national football team in the 1974 FIFA World Cup and the 1982 FIFA World Cup.

References

1951 births
Living people
Chilean footballers
Chile international footballers
1974 FIFA World Cup players
1982 FIFA World Cup players
1975 Copa América players
1979 Copa América players
Colo-Colo footballers
Association football defenders
People from Punta Arenas